Aqu Q'asa (Quechua aqu sand, q'asa mountain pass, "sand pass",  Hispanicized spelling Ajojasa) is a  mountain in the Wansu mountain range in the Andes of Peru. It is situated in the Apurímac Region, Antabamba Province, Oropesa District. Aqu Q'asa lies northeast of Hatun Qillqa.

References 

Mountains of Peru
Mountains of Apurímac Region